George Joseph Burnham (5 November 1878 – 7 March 1971) was an English cricketer who played first-class cricket for  Derbyshire in 1912.

Burnham was born in Nottingham, the son of Jesse Burnham, a millwright, and his wife Hannah.  He played his only first-class matches for Derbyshire in the 1912 season. He made his debut against Warwickshire in May 1912 when he was not out for 10 in the second innings. Over the next six weeks, he played four more matches, most of which were abandoned as draws, and that was the limit of his career. Burnham played six innings in five first-class matches with an average of 6.00 and a top score of 15.

Burnam acted as scorer in a few minor counties matches in the 1950s. He died at Nottingham at the age of 82.

References

1878 births
1971 deaths
Derbyshire cricketers
English cricketers